Ovalipes australiensis is a species of crab found in southern Australia. Its range extends from Western Australia to Queensland, including Tasmania. It is fished commercially  and recreationally, although it is not as important as the blue swimmer or mud crab.

References

Further reading

Portunoidea
Edible crustaceans
Crustaceans of Australia
Crustaceans described in 1968